Googal sometimes spelled as Google  is a village in the Devadurga taluk of Raichur district in Karnataka state, India. Googal is located on the banks of Krishna River.  Googal is famous for its cave temple dedicated to  Allama Prabhu.  Legend has it that Googal derives its name from kooguva kallu (singing stone), rocks that produce sound when river water strikes them. Googal is 50 km from district headquarters Raichur, and lies in Northwest direction.

See also
 Shorapur
 Maski
 Raichur
 Hatti
 Madagiri

References

Villages in Raichur district